Revista de Derecho is a biannual peer-reviewed law journal published by the Austral University of Chile. It was established in 1990 and is published by the Austral University of Chile. The editor-in-chief is Susan Turner (Austral University of Chile). The journal is abstracted and indexed in Scopus.

References

External links 
 

Law journals
Publications established in 1990
Austral University of Chile academic journals
Biannual journals
Spanish-language journals
1990 establishments in Chile
Creative Commons Attribution-licensed journals
Chilean law journals